Cochrane-Fountain City School District is a school district headquartered in Fountain City, Buffalo County, Wisconsin, United States. The school district serves students in grades K-12 from surrounding areas. Most students reside in Buffalo City, Cochrane, and Fountain City.

Athletics
The school's athletic teams, the Pirates, compete in the Dairyland Conference. The C-FC Pirates' cross-country team was the Wisconsin Division III boys' state champion four consecutive years, from 1993 to 1996, and girls' state champion in 1996, 1998, and 1999. The Pirates have won ten consecutive girls' volleyball conference championships, from the 2008 to 2017 seasons with the seasons of 2011, 2012, 2013, 2014, 2015, 2016 and 2017 all being undefeated in the Dairyland. The girls' softball team has won four consecutive conference championships, from 2009 to 2012. They continued the streak starting in 2014 and have taken the 2015, 2016 and 2017 seasons. In March 2014, the C-FC Pirates' made their first appearance for state Division 5 Boys basketball tournament at the Kohl Center, in Madison, Wisconsin. In the same year, the girls’ softball team made their first Division 4 state appearance, taking second place after losing to Oakfield. They made a second state appearance in the 2016 season.

References

External links
Cochrane-Fountain City School District

Education in Buffalo County, Wisconsin
School districts in Wisconsin